The Japan Company Rugby Football Championship (全国社会人ラグビーフットボール大会 Zenkoku Shakaijin Ragubi- Futtobo-ru Taikai) is a former Japanese rugby union competition that ran from 1948 to 2003. Teams from companies or the public service played in the competition that extended from December to January in every season. The first championship was played in 1948-49 season and won by Haitan Koudan which beat Kintetsu (now Kintetsu Liners). After 55 years, the Championship was absorbed by the Top League for the 2003–04 season. This had been a significant competition for the development of Japanese company rugby.

Japan Company Rugby Football Championship Finals 

 Bold is a winner of NHK Cup or Japan Championship.

References

Rugby union leagues in Japan
Rugby union
Sports leagues established in 1948
1948 establishments in Japan
Defunct rugby union leagues
2002 disestablishments in Japan